Two ships of the Royal Navy have borne the name HMS Gladiolus, after the flower, the Gladiolus:

  was an  sloop launched in 1915. She was sold to the Portuguese Navy in 1920 and renamed Republica, where she served until c. 1943.
  was a  launched in 1940 and sunk in 1941.

Royal Navy ship names